Algona is the county seat of Kossuth County, Iowa, United States. The population was 5,487 at the 2020 census. Ambrose A. Call State Park is located two miles southwest of the city.

History
Algona was founded in 1854 and was named after the Algonquian word for "Algonquin waters".

Between 1869 and 1875 the community was the location of Algona College, an institution sponsored by the Methodist Church.

In 1894, Algona, along with other Iowa communities such as Dysart and Wesley, became part of the project known as the "Orphan Trains". As New York City saw booming immigration, it also inevitably saw a rise in the number of orphans in its asylums. Unable to provide adequate care for them, it saw fit to ship nearly 100,000 westward to start a new life with families across America. Algona itself welcomed nearly 100 orphans into the town, many of whom remained lifelong residents.

From 1902 to 1906, Algona played host to the Algona Brownies, an African American barnstorming baseball team and interracial team the first two seasons. Despite being declared Western champions in 1903, the team disbanded as an interracial team that same year. The Algona Brownies were an independent interracial baseball team that played in the 1902 and 1903 seasons. They primarily made up of former members of the Chicago Unions, Columbia Giants, and Chicago Union Giants teams. After 1903, the team makeup changed from having both black and white players to a team of only black players. That year, their final year, they won the Western championship, defeating the Chicago Union Giants in a challenge playoff.

The Henry Adams Building, designed by Louis Sullivan in 1913 is located at the northwest corner of East State and Moore streets. Although not designed to be a bank, the building is nonetheless considered to be one of Sullivan's "Jewel Boxes," a series of banks built in the Midwest from 1909 through 1919.

Algona was the location of a German prisoner of war camp during World War II. From 1943 to 1946 Camp Algona held nearly 10,000 prisoners, many of whom were put to work on farms that had family fighting overseas.  As a main camp Algona had numerous sub-camps with a couple dozen in Minnesota.  A museum now commemorates the camp's history  including a nativity scene created by the POWs.

A destructive F3 tornado killed two people and destroyed a large part of Algona on June 28, 1979, about 7:15 PM. The tornado moved in a south-southeast direction through Algona. Severe damage was done to the central business district and a number of homes were rendered uninhabitable. Near F4 damage was reported in some locations. There was about 15 minutes' warning and the tornado sirens were sounded well before the arrival of the tornado. The fact that it was still daylight also contributed to the relatively low death count from this destructive storm.

In 2003, Algona drew national attention when it announced the purchase of the world's largest Cheetos puff. It was meant as a plan to bring tourism to the town to see the puff by a local radio DJ.

Geography
Algona is located along the East Fork Des Moines River.

Climate

Demographics

2010 census
As of the census of 2010, there were 5,560 people, 2,499 households, and 1,495 families living in the city. The racial makeup of the city was 97.2% White, 0.5% African American, 0.1% Native American, 0.7% Asian, 0.4% from other races, and 1.0% from two or more races. Hispanic or Latino of any race were 1.4% of the population.

There were 2,499 households, of which 25.2% had children under the age of 18 living with them, 48.3% were married couples living together, 7.9% had a female householder with no husband present, 3.6% had a male householder with no wife present, and 40.2% were non-families. 36.3% of all households were made up of individuals, and 18.1% had someone living alone who was 65 years of age or older. The average household size was 2.16 and the average family size was 2.79.

The median age in the city was 46.2 years. 21.9% of residents were under the age of 18; 6% were between the ages of 18 and 24; 20.8% were from 25 to 44; 27.1% were from 45 to 64; and 24.3% were 65 years of age or older. The gender makeup of the city was 47.5% male and 52.5% female.

2000 census
As of the census of 2000, there were 5,741 people, 2,434 households, and 1,550 families living in the city. The racial makeup of the city was 98.38% White, 0.09% African American, 0.19% Native American, 0.80% Asian, 0.02% Pacific Islander, 0.24% from other races, and 0.28% from two or more races. Hispanic or Latino of any race were 0.71% of the population.

There were 2,434 households, out of which 29.8% had children under the age of 18 living with them, 52.8% were married couples living together, 8.1% had a female householder with no husband present, and 36.3% were non-families. 32.9% of all households were made up of individuals, and 16.8% had someone living alone who was 65 years of age or older. The average household size was 2.29 and the average family size was 2.92.

Age spread: 24.5% under the age of 18, 7.1% from 18 to 24, 24.1% from 25 to 44, 23.1% from 45 to 64, and 21.2% who were 65 years of age or older. The median age was 42 years. For every 100 females, there were 87.7 males. For every 100 females age 18 and over, there were 83.6 males.

The median income for a household in the city was $32,207, and the median income for a family was $41,210. Males had a median income of $31,504 versus $20,667 for females. The per capita income for the city was $16,979. About 7.9% of families and 10.8% of the population were below the poverty line, including 14.9% of those under age 18 and 6.2% of those age 65 or over.

Education
There are two school systems in Algona. The Algona Community School District oversees the public school system. Algona High School has students from Algona Middle School, as well as students from several nearby towns, including grade-shared districts and from open enrollment. The public elementary schools in Algona are Lucia Wallace Elementary, Bryant Elementary, and Bertha Godfrey Elementary School.

The Catholic school system is made up of Bishop Garrigan High School (named after the first bishop of the Catholic Diocese of Sioux City) and Seton Elementary (named for St. Elizabeth Ann Seton).

Utilities

Utilities are provided by the Algona Municipal Utilities, which is directed by a five-member board of trustees appointed by the mayor. Drinking water is pumped from the Buried Sand and Gravel-Dakota aquifer and treated before being distributed to customers. Wastewater is collected and treated, and billed based on water usage. Stormwater impact fees are flat rates based upon the customer type.

Electricity is produced at the George Neal Generating Plant in Sioux City, Iowa, Whelan Unit 2 near Hastings, Nebraska, and the Iowa Distributed Wind Generation Project southeast of Algona. AMU is also a member of North Iowa Municipal Electric Cooperative Association. The AMU purchases power and distributes it to customers in Algona. AMU has also provided cable, internet, and phone service since 1997.

Notable people

Paul Bell – politician
Dick Dale – singer on Lawrence Welk television show
Lester Dickinson – U.S. Representative and U.S. Senator from Iowa
Steve Doocy – co-host of Fox & Friends, Fox News
Curt Hanson – educator and politician
Denis Menke – Major League baseball player and coach
Mike Mercer – National Football League kicker and punter
Brad Nelson – Major League baseball player
Mary Jane Odell – Iowa Secretary of State
Paul Seiler - Played in the American and National Football Leagues for the New York Jets and Oakland Raiders
Eric Swalwell – Congressman Dublin, CA, father was police chief Algona, Iowa
J.L. Wilkinson – owner of Kansas City Monarchs of the Negro Baseball League, member Baseball Hall of Fame

References

External links

 
Official site

 
Cities in Kossuth County, Iowa
Cities in Iowa
County seats in Iowa
Populated places established in 1854
1854 establishments in Iowa